Family Tree Maker is genealogy software for Windows and Mac that allows the researcher to keep track of information collected during research and to create reports, charts, and books containing that information. The software was originally developed by Kenneth Hess of Banner Blue Software, which was purchased by Broderbund in 1995. It passed through the hands of The Learning Company, SoftKey, Mattel, and others before coming under its current ownership. A redesigned Family Tree Maker 2008 was released on August 14, 2007. The 2009 version of the program corrected some of the errors and omissions of its predecessor, and introduced a few new features. Family Tree Maker 2010 claimed to further enhance the radical redesign and be more powerful and feature-packed with faster navigation and quicker load times.

A version for the Mac was released in 1997; due to low market demand, for over a decade it was discontinued. A new version of Family Tree Maker for Mac was released on November 4, 2010. Family Tree Maker Version 16 was awarded a Codie award in the "Best Consumer Productivity Solution" category in 2006. On December 8, 2015, Ancestry.com announced that it would discontinue Family Tree Maker. The announcement was met by fierce protest from Family Tree Maker users. On February 2, 2016, Ancestry.com announced that Software MacKiev, the company that had developed the Mac version of the software for more than six years, would acquire the Family Tree Maker brand, and take over the development and publishing of Mac and Windows editions.

The core functionality and user interface of Family Tree Maker 2017 have changed little since 2010. Software MacKiev touted four major improvements: FamilySearch integration, FamilySync, Color Coding, and Photo Darkroom. FamilySearch integration provides potential matches to the FamilySearch.org Family Tree, but not to their record collections. FamilySync is a replacement for Ancestry.com's TreeSync feature; it provides potential matches to family trees, indexes, and records at Ancestry.com. It was necessitated by Ancestry.com retiring their TreeSync application programming interface (API). While the old API was used exclusively by Ancestry.com, since they also owned Family Tree Maker, the new API is open to other software developers to use. Color Coding allows users to assign up to four different colors to a person and their ancestors. Photo Darkroom can darken faded black and white photos.

FTM version history

FTM merger history
 1984 Banner Blue Software founded by Ken Hess, "As the founder and president of Banner Blue Software from 1984 to 1996, I sold over two million copies of Family Tree Maker."
 May 1997 Broderbund Software acquired Parsons Technology from Intuit (which included the marketing rights to Family Origins for Windows
 August 1998 Broderbund Software acquired by The Learning Company (which included Family Tree Creator through an acquisition of Mindscape/IMSI. v5 Published
 Late 1998 The Learning Company acquired Palladium Interactive (which included Ultimate Family Tree).
 May 1999 The Learning Company was acquired by Mattel Incorporated "Barbie").v6 Published
 November 1999 A&E Television Networks, Hearst Interactive Media, Mattel, and private equity firms form Genealogy.com, LLC April 2000 v7.5 Published.
 February 2001 A&E TV acquired Genealogy.com
 Late 2001 Genealogy.com acquired the GenForum message board site, which it had been hosting for a few years
 June 2002 Genealogy.com acquired Generations PC product line from Sierra Home
 April 2003 Genealogy.com acquired by MyFamily.com
 December 2006 My Family.com Inc changed its name to The Generations Network 
 March 2016 Software MacKiev purchased FTM Software from ancestry.com

References

External links
 

Family Tree Maker